The  is a member of the Cabinet of Japan and is the leader and chief executive of the Ministry of Land, Infrastructure, Transport and Tourism. The minister is also a statutory member of the National Security Council, and is nominated by the Prime Minister of Japan and is appointed by the Emperor of Japan.

The current minister is Tetsuo Saitō, who took office on 4 October 2021.

List of Ministers of Land, Infrastructure, Transport and Tourism (2001–)

External links
Official site

 
Japan
Japan